The Gavilanes de Maracaibo was a Venezuelan professional baseball club based in Maracaibo, the capital city of Zulia state. The team was founded by the brothers and ballplayers Ernesto Aparicio and Luis Aparicio, Sr., and debuted in the extinct Zulian Baseball League First Division, which was created in 1932 and folded at the end of the 1940 season. After five years of absence, the league resumed operations in 1946 and remained active until 1952.

The Gavilanes (Sparrowhawks) were the most successful team in this period, winning 13 of the 17 tournaments played, eight with Ernesto Aparicio at the helm. As a result, Gavilanes and the Pastora BBC maintained a strong and fierce rivalry on the baseball field during the existence of the league. Accustomed to second place in the standings, Pastora captured the 1934 and 1948 titles while the Orange Victoria team won in the 1951 season.

After that, the circuit was renamed Liga Occidental de Béisbol Profesional before joining Organized Baseball in 1953, operating continuously until 1964. 

In 1953, the Venezuelan Professional Baseball League and the recent created LOBP agreed to have the most representative clubs from each circuit meet in a National Championship Series called El Rotatorio, the first and only in VPBL history. The Cervecería Caracas and Navegantes del Magallanes clubs represented the VPBL, while Gavilanes and Pastora represented the LOBP. The Gavilanes were managed by  Red Kress, a former major league shortstop and minor league manager.

The pennant was clinched by the Pastora club with a 48-30 record, winning easily over Magallanes (40-37), Gavilanes (34-44) and Caracas (33-44). The disappointing Gavilanes were a favorite to grasp the championship, as the team featured a remarkably well-balanced squad headed by pitchers Alejandro Carrasquel, Bob Chakales, Emilio Cueche, Art Houtteman, Sad Sam Jones, Elmer Singleton, Bill Upton and Lenny Yochim; catchers Earl Averill and Hank Foiles; infielders Piper Davis (2B/3B), Dalmiro Finol (3B/2B/1B) and Lee Thomas (1B); outfielders Joe Frazier (RF), Jim Lemon (LF) and Dave Pope (CF), and a 19-year-old rookie shortstop named Luis Aparicio, Jr., who in 1984 would become the first Venezuelan player to be enshrined in the Baseball Hall of Fame.

The Gavilanes came back to the Occidental League for the inaugural 1954-55 season, winning consecutive titles in the 1955-56 and 1956-57 tournaments. Out in the 1957-58 season, Gavilanes returned as a replacement for the Centauros de Maracaibo in 1958-59 and played its last season in 1959-60.

The LOBP ceased operations after the 1963-64 season. Since then, no other team named Gavilanes has participated in Venezuelan professional baseball.

Highlights
 Legendary Venezuelan manager Ernesto Aparicio finished with nine managing titles (1933, 1937, 1940, 1946–1947, 1949–1952; 1955-56).
 Managers Lázaro Salazar (Cuba) and Luis Rodríguez Olmo (Puerto Rico) also led the team to the title (1938 and 1948, respectively).
 Pitcher Barney Schultz won seven consecutive strikeout titles (1954-55 through 1960-61).
 Pitcher Dave Hoskins posted the most wins in three consecutive seasons (1955-56 – 1957-58) and the best ERA in a single season (1956-57).
 Pitcher Bill Harris collected the best ERA in a single season (1959-60).
 Outfielder Billy Queen won the home runs and RBI titles in a single season (1958-59).
 First baseman Joe Altobelli won the batting title in a single season (1955-56).

Sources
 Gutiérrez, Daniel; Alvarez, Efraim; Gutiérrez (h), Daniel (2006). La Enciclopedia del Béisbol en Venezuela. LVBP, Caracas. 
 Gutiérrez, Daniel; González, Javier (1992). Numeritos del béisbol profesional venezolano (1946-1992). LVBP, Caracas. 
 Salas, Alexis (1988). Los eternos rivales 1908–1988: Caracas–Magallanes, Pastora–Gavilanes. Seguros Caracas, Caracas.

External links
La Historia del Béisbol en el Zulia (I) (Spanish)
La Historia del Béisbol en el Zulia (II) (Spanish)
Meridiano.com – Historia de la Liga Venezolana de Béisbol Profesional (Spanish)
PuraPelota.com – 1953-1954 Gavilanes BBC
es.Wikipedia.org – Historia del béisbol en Venezuela
es.Wikipedia.org – Liga Venezolana de Béisbol Profesional

1932 establishments in Venezuela
Defunct baseball teams in Venezuela
Liga Occidental de Béisbol Profesional
Baseball teams established in 1932
Sport in Maracaibo